Jules Amez-Droz (30 June 1921 – August 2012) was a Swiss épée and sabre fencer. He competed at the 1952 and 1960 Summer Olympics.

References

External links
 

1921 births
2012 deaths
Swiss male sabre fencers
Olympic fencers of Switzerland
Fencers at the 1952 Summer Olympics
Fencers at the 1960 Summer Olympics
Sportspeople from Zürich
Swiss male épée fencers